The 1986 UEFA Cup Final was an association football tie played on 30 April and 6 May 1986 between Real Madrid of Spain and Köln of West Germany. Madrid won 5–3 on aggregate and, in doing so, successfully defended their UEFA Cup title from the year prior.

Route to the final

En route to reaching the final, both Real Madrid and FC Köln benefitted from performing extremely well at home. In the first five rounds of the competition, Los Blancos had won all five home legs, outscoring opponents by a total of 19 goals to 2 in games played at the Bernabéu in Madrid. Köln was also dominant in their home fixtures–– throughout the entire competition, the West German side conceded only one goal whilst playing as the home team.

In the third round, Real Madrid achieved a shocking comeback against two-time champions Borussia Mönchengladbach. After being crushed by Gladbach in the away leg by a score of 5–1, Real stormed back to win the return leg 4–0, thus advancing on away goals. This is still regarded as one of the greatest comebacks in the history of European continental football.

This was also the second year in a row in which Real Madrid eliminated Inter Milan in the semi-finals of the UEFA Cup.

Match details

First leg

Second leg

Scheduling changes
The second leg was originally scheduled for Thursday, 8 May, but was moved to Tuesday, 6 May, following a request by Real Madrid due to their domestic fixtures. Additionally, the match was played in Berlin instead of Cologne because of sanctions imposed by UEFA on Köln stipulating that they must play at least 350 km from their home stadium after trouble caused by supporters during the 2nd leg of the semi-final against Waregem.

Result
Like Real Madrid had in the earlier stages of the competition, Köln went into the second leg 5–1 down. However, Die Geißböcke were unable to replicate Real's successful third-round comeback against Mönchengladbach. Though Köln won the match 2–0 at home, it wasn't enough, and Real were crowned champions for the second successive year.

See also
1986 European Cup Final
1986 European Cup Winners' Cup Final
1. FC Köln in European football
Real Madrid CF in international football competitions

References

External links
RSSSF

2
Real Madrid CF matches
1. FC Köln matches
1986
1986
1986
1985–86 in Spanish football
1985–86 in German football
April 1986 sports events in Europe
May 1986 sports events in Europe
1980s in Madrid
1986 in West German sport
Sports competitions in Madrid